Bill Jennings (September 12, 1919 – November 29, 1978) was an American jazz guitarist and composer.

Career
Recording as both a leader and a sideman, Jennings has been called "the architect of soul jazz" and has influenced on jazz, soul, R&B, and blues guitar. B.B. King often mentioned Jennings as one of biggest influences. Jennings recorded with such artists as Willis "Gator" Jackson, Brother Jack McDuff, Leo Parker, Bill Doggett, Louis Jordan, King Curtis, Louis Armstrong, and Ella Fitzgerald and unique in his ability to play in many styles, including swing, bop, jump blues, R&B, and pop. Jennings played on "Fever" by Little Willie John, which made the Billboard R&B chart in the US and peaked at number 24 on the Billboard Hot 100.

A left-handed player, Jennings played guitar upside down, with the high strings at the top, which gave him a different approach to phrasing and bending the strings. Later in his career, he lost a finger on his fretting hand and began playing bass guitar.

Death
Jennings died at Veterans Hospital in Indianapolis on November 29, 1978. He was a United States Navy veteran and a member of the Church of God.

Discography

As leader
 Mood Indigo (King, 1956)
 Billy in the Lion's Den (King, 1957)
 Enough Said! (Prestige, 1959)
 Glide On (Prestige, 1960)

As sideman
With Willis Jackson
 Please Mr. Jackson (Prestige, 1959)
 Cookin' Sherry (Prestige, 1960)
 Blue Gator (Prestige, 1960)
 Thunderbird (Prestige, 1962)
 Together Again! (Prestige, 1965)
 Together Again, Again (Prestige, 1967)
 Star Bag (Prestige, 1968)
 Swivelhips  (Prestige, 1969)
 Gator's Groove (Prestige, 1969)

With Brother Jack McDuff
 Brother Jack (Prestige, 1960)

With others
 Roy Brown, Laughing but Crying (Route 66, 1977)
 Kenny Burrell, Guitar Soul (Status 1965)
 The Charms, Glory Spots (Motherwit, 1991)
 Wild Bill Davis, Flying High (Everest, 1959)
 Bill Doggett, Moondust (Odeon 1959)
 Shakey Jake Harris, Good Times (Bluesville, 1960)
 Little Willie John, Fever (Regency, 1956)
 Etta Jones, The Jones Girl...Etta...Sings, Sings, Sings (King, 1958)
 Betty Roche, Singin' & Swingin (Prestige, 1961)

References 

1919 births
1978 deaths
Musicians from Indiana
20th-century American guitarists
American jazz guitarists
American male guitarists
Soul-jazz guitarists
20th-century American male musicians
American male jazz musicians